Charles Taylor (1840 – August 3, 1899) was an American cavalry soldier and Medal of Honor recipient. He was cited for "gallantry in action" in the Battle of Big Dry Wash in the Apache Wars in the Arizona Territory in 1882, for which he received the Medal of Honor. Three other men, First Lieutenant Frank West, Second Lieutenant Thomas Cruse and Second Lieutenant George H. Morgan were also awarded Medals of Honor in this action.

Death and burial
Taylor attained the rank of First Sergeant before his death on August 3, 1899.  He is buried at Soldiers Home National Cemetery in plot K-0851.

Medal of Honor citation
Rank and organization: First Sergeant, Company D, 3d U.S. Cavalry. Place and date: At Big Dry Wash, Ariz., 17 July 1882. Entered service at: ------. Birth: Baltimore, Md. Date of issue: 16 December 1882.

Citation:

Gallantry in action.

See also

List of Medal of Honor recipients
List of Medal of Honor recipients for the Indian Wars

References

1840 births
1899 deaths
American Indian Wars recipients of the Medal of Honor
American military personnel of the Indian Wars
Burials at United States Soldiers' and Airmen's Home National Cemetery
Military personnel from Baltimore
United States Army Medal of Honor recipients
United States Army soldiers
United States Military Academy alumni